Rušona Parish is an administrative unit of Preiļi Municipality in the Latgale region of Latvia. At the beginning of 2014, the population of the parish was 1590. The administrative center is Kastīre village.

Towns, villages and settlements of Rušona Parish 
 Baški
 Gaiļmuiža
 Geļenova
 Kastīre
 Kliškova
 Rušona

References

External links 
 

Parishes of Latvia
Preiļi Municipality
Latgale